Andries Viljoen (born 8 October 1997) is a South African rugby union player for the  in the Currie Cup. His regular position is centre.

Viljoen was named in the  side for the 2022 Currie Cup Premier Division.

References

South African rugby union players
Living people
Rugby union centres
Boland Cavaliers players
Urayasu D-Rocks players
Pumas (Currie Cup) players
1997 births